Stemonosudis bullisi  is a species of fish found in the Western Central Atlantic and the northeastern Gulf of Mexico.

Size

Etymology
The fish is named in honor of marine biologist Harvey R. Bullis, Jr. (1924-1992), to whom many American ichthyologists, the author included, are  indebted for supplying valuable marine collections from the cruises of the Oregon and other vessels of the United States Fish and Wildlife Service, including the type specimen of this species.

References 

Paralepididae
Taxa named by Robert Rees Rofen
Fish described in 1963
Fish of the Gulf of Mexico
Fish of the Atlantic Ocean